Idiastes is a genus of ground beetles in the family Carabidae. There are at least two described species in Idiastes, found in Borneo and Indonesia.

Species
These two species belong to the genus Idiastes:
 Idiastes alaticollis Andrewes, 1931
 Idiastes costatus Andrewes, 1931

References

Platyninae